Eneida A. Mendonça, is a Brazilian-born physician-scientist and biomedical informatician. She pioneered the use of natural language processing in both the biomedical literature and in electronic medical record narratives in order to identify knowledge relevant to medical decision making in the context of the patient care. In addition, she has devoted many years to develop innovative clinical information systems that have been integrated in the NewYork–Presbyterian Hospital, the Columbia University Medical Center, and the Cornell Medical Center.
She holds a medical degree from the Federal University of Pelotas, Brazil and a Ph.D. in biomedical informatics from Columbia University, New York.

Currently, Mendonça is the Inaugural VP for Research Development of the Regenstrief Institute at the Indiana University School of Medicine. Mendonça has contributed over 100 publications to the fields of biomedical informatics and medicine.

Publications
 Medline Publications
 Google Scholar Citations

References

External links
 Eneida A. Mendonça’s former homepage as Faculty at Columbia University
 Eneida A. Mendonça’s at The University of Chicago

Living people
Brazilian scientists
Federal University of Pelotas alumni
University of Chicago faculty
Health informaticians
Year of birth missing (living people)
Natural language processing researchers
Data miners